Purcell is a crater on Mercury, located near the north pole.  Its name was adopted by the International Astronomical Union (IAU) in 1979. It is named for the English composer Henry Purcell.

References

Impact craters on Mercury